Love, Nancy is a 1994 album by Nancy Wilson.

"Love Won't Let Me Wait" was released as the album's only single in 1994. It reached no. 31 on the Billboard Adult R&B Airplay chart, and no. 64 on the R&B/Hip-Hop Airplay chart.

Critical reception

Love, Nancy received mostly positive reviews from music critics upon its release, most of whom complimented Wilson's vocal performance. Writing for the Miami Herald, Mario Tarradell stated that Wilson is "adept at taking others' tunes and molding them around her expressive pipes, setting her own mood." Karl Stark of Lexington Herald-Leader stated that Wilson's voice sounds "as silken as ever", with arrangements that "enhance her already sophisticated aura". In The Province, Renee Doruyter stated that Love, Nancy "demonstrates the reasons for her longevity", and that Wilson's strength "is the way she makes you believe the words". In another rave review for The Charlotte Observer, Sheila Solomon described the album as "a powerful collection of love songs", commending Wilson's enunciation.

In a retrospective review, AllMusic's Ron Wynn stated that "Andre Fischer's production lets Wilson's still enchanting, powerful voice dominate the orchestrations," concluding that while there are "occasional tasty instrumental contributions from selected guest stars [...] for the most part it's Wilson's warm, inviting leads that make this CD so delightful."

Track listing
 "Love Dance" (Ivan Lins, Gilson Peranzzetta, Paul Williams) – 4:29
 "Day Dream" (Duke Ellington, John Latouche) – 5:12
 "Love, I Found You" (Danny Small) – 4:02
 "I Can't Make You Love Me" (Mike Reid, Allen Shamblin) – 5:19
 "Loving You" (Artie Butler, Norman Martin) – 4:09
 "First Time on a Ferris Wheel" (Harriet Schock, Misha Segal) – 4:26
 "More Love" (Segal) – 4:05
 "Where in the World" (Diane Louie) – 3:36
 "I Remember" (Stephen Sondheim) – 4:15
 "Love Won't Let Me Wait" (Vinnie Barrett, Bobby Eli) – 4:11
 "Magic Door" (Yves Gilbert, Serge Lama, Clyde Otis) – 3:15
 "Your Arms of Love" (BeBe Winans) – 4:19

Charts

Credits and personnel
Adapted from album liner notes.

Musicians

 Nancy Wilson – lead vocals 
 Randy Waldman – piano , synthesizer , arrangement , programming , string arrangement , all instruments 
 Jimmy Johnson – bass 
 Andre Fischer – drums , arrangement 
 Gerald Albright – saxophone , alto sax solo 
 Jeremy Lubbock – arrangement , string arrangement 
 Jim Hughart – bass 
 John Chiodini – guitar 
 Roy McCurdy – drums 
 Neil Stubenhaus – bass 
 Ndugu Chancler – drums 
 Carlos Vega – drums 
 Richard Evans – arrangement 
 Diane Louie – arrangement , piano , synthesizer 
 Tom Keane – synth bass , drum programming 
 Dennis Budimir – solo guitar 
 Ian Prince – arrangement , programming 
 Jerry Peters – arrangement , piano 
 Linda McCrary – background vocals 
 Terry Young – background vocals 
 Bridgette Bryant – background vocals 
 Bobbette Harrison – background vocals 
 Mona Lisa Young – background vocals 
 Ricky Nelson – background vocals 
 Maxi Anderson – background vocals

Strings

 Assa Drori – violin, concert master
 Israel Baker – violin
 Isabelle Daskoff – violin
 Mark Cargill – violin
 Yvette Deveraux – violin
 Irving Geller – violin
 Gina Kronstadt – violin
 Gordon Marron – violin
 Mari Tsumura – violin
 Shari Zippert – violin
 Henry Ferber – violin
 Irving Cellar – violin
 Juliann French – violin
 Don Palmer – violin
 Kwihee Shamban – violin
 Elizabeth Wilson – violin
 Ron Clark – violin
 Miran Kojian – violin
 Haim Shtrum – violin
 Marilyn Baker – viola
 Margot MacLaine – viola
 Herschel Wise – viola
 Rollice Dale – viola
 Kenneth Burward-Hoy – viola
 James Ross – viola
 Evan Wilson – viola
 Fred Seykora – cello
 Suzie Katayama – cello
 Larry Corbett – cello
 Ernest Ehrhardt – cello
 Raymond Kelly – cello
 David Shamban – cello
 Todd Hemmenway – cello
 Daniel Smith – cello
 Christian Kollgaard – double bass
 Norman Ludwin – double bass
 Edward Meares – double bass
 Susan Ranney – double bass

Brass and woodwind

 John Mitchell – saxophone
 Richard Mitchell – saxophone
 John Yoakum – saxophone
 Calvin Smith – French horn
 Gregory Williams – French horn
 Oscar Brashear – trumpet
 Frank Szabo – trumpet

Technical

 Dr. George Butler – executive producer
 Al Schmitt – engineering, mixing
 Jeffrey "Woody" Woodruff – engineering , mixing 
 Alan Sides – engineering
 Doug Rider – engineering
 Kenny Deranteriasian – assistant engineering
 John Hendrickson – assistant engineering
 Brett Swain – assistant engineering
 Jeff Shannon – assistant engineering
 Richard Landers – assistant engineering
 Ulrich Wild – assistant engineering
 Patty Nichols – production coordinator
 Keith Petrie – assistant to Andre Fischer
 Jules Chaikin – contractor
 John Levy – management

Design
 Nancy Donald – art direction
 Charles Bush – photography
 George Blodwell – stylist
 Cloutier Roebuck – stylist
 Edward Roebuck – stylist
 John Atchison – hair
 Rudy Calvo – makeup
 Johnnetta B. Cole – liner notes

References

1994 albums
Nancy Wilson (jazz singer) albums
Columbia Records albums